Rose Isle is an island in the River Thames in England just downstream of Kennington Railway Bridge on the reach above Sandford Lock, near Kennington, Oxfordshire.

The island is tree-covered and has a narrow channel behind it crossed by a footbridge. It was formerly used for the growing of osiers (basket willows, used for basketry, furniture, and cart-making). The house on the island replaces the Swan Hotel which was formerly a well-known stopping point on the river. The island was also known in the past as Kennington Island or St Michael's Island.

From a local government perspective, the island is in the civil parish of Sandford-on-Thames in the district of South Oxfordshire.

See also
Islands in the River Thames

References

 Leigh Hatts. The Thames path: from the sea to the source. Cicerone Press, 2005. ; p. 167 

Islands of Oxfordshire
Islands of the River Thames
South Oxfordshire District